Libelle may refer to:

Aircraft
 Dornier Libelle, a German flying boat
 Dornier Do 12 Libelle III
 Flylight Libelle, a British powered hang glider
 Glasflügel H-201 Standard Libelle, a German glider
Glasflügel 205 Club Libelle
Glasflügel H-301 Libelle
 Lom-55, 57 and 58 Libelle, gliders by Lommatzsch, East Germany

Arts, entertainment and media
 Libelle (literary genre), a political pamphlet or book which slanders a public figure
 Libelle (Belgian magazine), a weekly women's magazine published in Flanders, Belgium
 Libelle (Dutch magazine), a women's weekly magazine published in the Netherlands
 Libelle of Englyshe Polycye, a fifteenth-century poem
 Die Libelle (The Dragonfly) Op. 204, a dance by Josef Strauss, 1866

Other uses
 Libelle (barque), a German sailing ship 1864–1866
 Libelle (cipher), a German cipher system
 Libelle (microcar), an Austrian 1950s vehicle
 Libelle, a fast jet aircrew g-suit
 Operation Libelle, an evacuation of German Armed Forces from Tirana, 1997
 Project 131 Libelle Torpedo Boat, or Libelle Klasse, East German torpedo boats

See also

Libelluloidea, a superfamily of dragonflies
Libel, or defamation